Jacinda Ardern announced a reshuffled shadow cabinet on 3 August 2017, just two days after she was elected Leader of the Labour Party in New Zealand. The changes were relatively minor and mostly kept the structure inherited from her predecessor Andrew Little. As the Labour Party formed the largest party not in government, this Frontbench team was as a result the Official Opposition of the New Zealand House of Representatives.

Frontbench team
The list below contains a list of Ardern's spokespeople and their respective roles.

References

New Zealand Labour Party
Ardern, Jacinda
2017 in New Zealand
2017 establishments in New Zealand
2017 disestablishments in New Zealand
Jacinda Ardern